Matulionis is a surname. Notable people with the surname include:

 Algis Matulionis (born 1947), Soviet and Lithuanian actor and screenwriter 
 Osvaldas Matulionis (born 1991), Lithuanian basketball player
 Teofilius Matulionis (1873–1962), Roman Catholic prelate